Devdatt Kumar Kikabhai Patel (1938–2001) was a leader of Bharatiya Janata Party from Gujarat. He was a member of Rajya Sabha from 1970 to 1976. Patel was elected to Gujarat Legislative Assembly in 1998 from Mahuva.

References

1938 births
2001 deaths
Rajya Sabha members from Gujarat
Gujarat MLAs 1998–2002
People from Bhavnagar district
Bharatiya Jana Sangh politicians
Bharatiya Janata Party politicians from Gujarat